Sharon Walsh defeated Marina Kroschina in the final, 8–6, 6–4 to win the girls' singles tennis title at the 1970 Wimbledon Championships.

Draw

Finals

Top half

Bottom half

References

External links

Girls' Singles
Wimbledon Championship by year – Girls' singles
1970 in English women's sport